The Mamas & the Papas Greatest Hits album is a compilation of hits released on March 10, 1998. In 2003, the album was ranked at number 423 on Rolling Stone magazine's list of The 500 Greatest Albums of All Time.

Track listing
 "California Dreamin'" (2:42)
 "Go Where You Wanna Go" (2:30)
 "Monday, Monday" (3:29)
 "I Call Your Name" (2:39)
 "Do You Wanna Dance" (3:01)
 "I Saw Her Again" (3:15)
 "You Baby" (2:23)
 "Dancing Bear" (4:12)
 "Words of Love" (2:17)
 "No Salt on Her Tail" (2:43)
 "Look Through My Window" (3:09)
 "Dancing in the Street" (3:50)
 "Dedicated to the One I Love" (3:00)
 "Creeque Alley" (3:51)
 "Glad to Be Unhappy" (1:45)
 "Twist and Shout" (2:55)
 "Twelve Thirty (Young Girls Are Coming to the Canyon)" (3:28)
 "My Girl" (3:35)
 "Safe in My Garden" (3:15)
 "Dream a Little Dream of Me" (3:14)

Personnel
Vocals and Guitar: John Phillips
Vocals: Denny Doherty
Vocals: Cass Elliot
Vocals: Michelle Phillips
Producer: Lou Adler, Andy McKaie
Design: Mike Fink
Compilation: Andy McKaie

References

External links
Yahoo Discography
Answers.com review
Amazon.com

The Mamas and the Papas albums
Albums produced by Lou Adler
1998 compilation albums